Mohammadabad (also Romanized as Moḩammadābād) is a village in Howmeh Rural District, in the Central District of Damghan County, Semnan Province, Iran. At the 2006 census, its population was 119, in 31 families.

References 

Populated places in Damghan County